William Sheridan or Will Sheridan may refer to:

 William C. R. Sheridan (1917–2005), American Episcopalian bishop of Northern Indiana
 William Sheridan (bishop of Kilmore and Ardagh) (c. 1635–1711), Irish clergyman
 William Sheridan (politician) (1858–1931), Australian politician
 William E. Sheridan (1839-1887), American actor
 Will Sheridan (born 1985), American basketball player
 Will Sheridan (cricketer) (born 1987), Australian cricketer
Bill Sheridan, American football coach
Bill Sheridan (basketball) (1942–2020), American basketball player and coach

See also
Billy Sheridan (disambiguation)
 Sheridan (disambiguation)